Tessmannianthus carinatus is a species of plant in the family Melastomataceae. It is endemic to Panama.  It is threatened by habitat loss.

References

Endemic flora of Panama
carinatus
Critically endangered plants
Taxonomy articles created by Polbot